Nguyễn Thành Phương was a Vietnamese general under the Cao Đài sect and was in command of 25,000 soldiers.

References

Vietnamese people of the Vietnam War
Vietnamese military personnel
Vietnamese Caodaists
Possibly living people
Year of birth missing